The 2019–20 Texas–Rio Grande Valley Vaqueros men's basketball team represented the University of Texas Rio Grande Valley in the 2019–20 NCAA Division I men's basketball season. The Vaqueros, led by fourth-year head coach Lew Hill, played their home games at the UTRGV Fieldhouse in Edinburg, Texas as members of the Western Athletic Conference. They finished the season 14–16, 9–7 in WAC play to finish in third place. They were set to be the No. 2 seed in the WAC tournament, however, the tournament was cancelled amid the COVID-19 pandemic.

Previous season
The Vaqueros finished the 2018–19 season 20–17, 9–7 in WAC play to finish in 4th place. In the WAC tournament, they defeated Cal State Bakersfield in the quarterfinals, before falling to top-seeded New Mexico State in the semifinals. They received an invitation to the CollegeInsider.com Tournament, where they defeated Grambling State in the first round, before losing to Texas Southern in the second round.

Roster

Schedule and results

|-
!colspan=12 style=| Regular season

|-
!colspan=12 style=| WAC tournament
|- style="background:#bbbbbb"
| style="text-align:center"|Mar 12, 20208:00 pm, ESPN+
| style="text-align:center"| (2)
| vs. (7) Cal State BakersfieldQuarterfinals
| colspan=2 rowspan=1 style="text-align:center"|Cancelled due to the COVID-19 pandemic
| style="text-align:center"|Orleans ArenaParadise, NV
|-

Source

References

UT Rio Grande Valley Vaqueros men's basketball seasons
Texas-Rio Grande Valley Vaqueros
Texas-Rio Grande Valley Vaqueros men's basketball
Texas-Rio Grande Valley Vaqueros men's basketball